This list of churches in Agder og Telemark is a list of the Church of Norway churches in the Diocese of Agder og Telemark in Agder and Vestfold og Telemark counties in southern Norway. The diocese is based at the Kristiansand Cathedral in the city of Kristiansand.  The diocese includes all of Agder county and the majority of Vestfold og Telemark county, with the exception of the far eastern part of that county which belongs to the Diocese of Tunsberg.

This list is divided into nine sections, one for each Deanery in the diocese. Administratively within each deanery, the churches are divided by municipalities, each of which have their own church council. Each municipal church council may be made up of more than one parish, each of which may have their own council. Each parish may have one or more congregations in it.

Kristiansand domprosti 
This arch-deanery covers all the churches within the municipality of Kristiansand in southern Agder county.  The arch-deanery is headquartered at the Kristiansand Cathedral in the city of Kristiansand in Kristiansand municipality. On 4 May 1819, the large Mandal prosti was created when it split off from the domprosti. On 1 January 2020, the parishes in the old municipalities of Songdalen and Søgne were merged into the arch-deanery when the municipality of Kristiansand was enlarged.

Arendal prosti 
This deanery covers a small, coastal, urban area covering the municipalities of Arendal and Froland in Agder county. The deanery is headquartered at Trinity Church in the town of Arendal in Arendal municipality. The deanery was established on 1 January 1872 when it was split off from the Vest-Nedenes prosti. It initially included all the parishes of Trefoldighet, Barbu, Austre Moland, Tromøy, Hisøy, Øyestad, Froland, and Herefoss.  The parishes of Austre Moland, Flosta, and Stokken were merged to form the parish of Moland effective 1 January 2018.

Aust-Nedenes prosti  
This deanery covers the eastern part of Agder county including the municipalities of Gjerstad, Tvedestrand, Risør, Åmli, and Vegårshei.  The deanery is headquartered at Tvedestrand Church in the town of Tvedestrand in Tvedestrand municipality.  The deanery was established on 1 March 1826 when it was split off from the old Nedenes prosti. The deanery was named Østre Nedenæs prosti until 19 May 1922 when it was renamed Aust-Nedenes prosti.

Bamble prosti 
This deanery covers the southeastern part of Vestfold og Telemark county including the municipalities of Bamble, Drangedal, and Kragerø. The deanery is headquartered at Kragerø Church in the town of Kragerø in Kragerø municipality. The deanery was created in 1843 when the old Nedre Telemark og Bamble prosti was divided into Nedre Telemark prosti and Bamble prosti. Bamble prosti originally included the parishes of Bamble, Gjerpen, Siljan, Langesund, Drangedal, Eidanger, Brevik, Kragerø, and Porsgrunn. In 1868, the parishes of Siljan, Gjerpen, Porsgrunn, Eidanger and Brevik were transferred to the newly created Skien prosti.

Lister og Mandal prosti 
This deanery covers the western part of Agder county, including the municipalities of Farsund, Flekkefjord, Hægebostad, Kvinesdal, Lindesnes, Lyngdal, and Sirdal. The deanery is headquartered at Lyngdal Church in the town of Lyngdal in Lyngdal Municipality. The deanery was created on 1 January 2020 when the old Lister prosti and Mandal prosti were merged.

The old Lister prosti was headquartered at Flekkefjord Church in the town of Flekkefjord in Flekkefjord municipality and the deanery included the municipalities of Farsund, Flekkefjord, Hægebostad, Kvinesdal, Lyngdal, and Sirdal.  The old Mandal prosti included the municipalities of Audnedal, Lindesnes, Mandal, Marnardal, Songdalen, Søgne, and Åseral (until 2019).  The deanery was headquartered at Mandal Church in the town of Mandal in Mandal municipality.

Otredal prosti 
This deanery covers the Otra river valley through Agder county, this includes the Setesdal and upper Torridal valleys. It includes the municipalities of Bygland, Evje og Hornnes, Bykle, Iveland, Valle, Vennesla, and Åseral. The deanery is headquartered at Vennesla Church in the village of Vennesla in Vennesla municipality in Agder county.

Otredal deanery, originally called Torridal prosti, was created 10 May 1862 when it was carved out of the three neighboring deaneries of Råbyggelaget prosti, Mandal prosti, and Vestre Nedenes prosti. Initially, it included the municipalities of Oddernes, Øvrebø, Søgne, and Tveit.  Over time, the borders of Torridal deanery have been changed. In 1883, the Søgne parish was moved (back) to the Mandal prosti and the Tveit parish was moved (back) to the Vestre Nedenes prosti. Also in 1883, the parishes of Valle, Evje, and Bygland joined Torridal when the old Setesdal (Råbyggelaget prosti) deanery was dissolved. In 1905, the Tveit parish was moved back (again) to Torridal. On 12 June 1931 the name of the deanery was changed from Torridal to Otredal. On 1 January 2019, the parish of Åseral was moved from Mandal prosti to Otredal prosti.

Skien prosti 
This deanery covers part of Vestfold og Telemark county including the municipalities of Siljan, Skien, and Porsgrunn. The deanery is headquartered at Skien Church in the town of Skien in Skien municipality. The deanery was established in 1868 when it was created from some of the parishes from Bamble prosti and Nedre Telemark prosti.

Vest-Nedenes prosti 
This deanery covers the southeastern part of Agder county including the municipalities of Birkenes, Grimstad, and Lillesand. The deanery is headquartered at Lillesand Church in the town of Lillesand in Lillesand municipality.  The deanery was established on 1 March 1826 when it was split off from the old Nedenes prosti. The deanery was named Vestre Nedenæs prosti until 19 May 1922 when it was renamed Vest-Nedenes prosti.

Øvre Telemark prosti 
This deanery covers the western part of Vestfold og Telemark county including the municipalities of Fyresdal, Hjartdal, Kviteseid, Midt-Telemark, Nissedal, Nome, Notodden, Seljord, Tinn, Tokke, and Vinje. The deanery is headquartered at Seljord Church in the village of Seljord in Seljord municipality. The deanery existed until 1838 when it was divided into Aust-Telemark prosti and Vest-Telemark prosti. In 2006, Nedre Telemark prosti (established 1843) was dissolved and divided between Aust-Telemark and Vest-Telemark deaneries. The deanery was recreated on 1 January 2015 when Aust-Telemark prosti and Vest-Telemark prosti were merged.

References

 
Agder og Telemark